Chizzy is a nickname. Notable people known by this name include the following:

Nickname
Andrea Chizoba "Chizzy" Akudolu (born 1973), British actress
Chigozie Stephanie "Chizzy" Alichi (born 1993), Nigerian film actress
Chizzy Chisholm, former band member of Big Mountain (band)
Dave Chisnall (born 1980), English darts player

Mononym
Chizzy, mononym by which Charles Stephens III is known, K-pop and R & B songwriter and producer with credits such as Indigo (Chris Brown album), A.K.A. (album), Neo Zone & NCT 2020 Resonance

See also

Bruno Chizzo